The Republican Party, also referred to as the GOP ("Grand Old Party"), is one of the two major contemporary political parties in the United States. The GOP was founded in 1854 by anti-slavery activists who opposed the Kansas–Nebraska Act, which allowed for the potential expansion of chattel slavery into the western territories. It has been the main political rival of the Democratic Party since the mid-1850s. Like them, the Republican Party is a big tent of competing and often opposing ideologies. Presently, the Republican Party contains prominent conservative, centrist, populist, and right-libertarian factions.

The Republican Party's ideological and historical predecessor is considered to be Northern members of the Whig Party, with Republican presidents Abraham Lincoln, Rutherford B. Hayes, Chester A. Arthur, and Benjamin Harrison all being Whigs before switching to the party, from which they were elected. The collapse of the Whigs, which had previously been one of the two major parties in the country, strengthened the party's electoral success. Upon its founding, it supported classical liberalism and economic reform while opposing the expansion of slavery. The Republican Party initially consisted of Northern Protestants, factory workers, professionals, businessmen, prosperous farmers, and from 1866, former black slaves. It had almost no presence in the Southern United States at its inception, but was very successful in the Northern United States where, by 1858, it had enlisted former Whigs and former Free Soil Democrats to form majorities in nearly every state in New England. While both parties adopted pro-business policies in the 19th century, the early GOP was distinguished by its support for the national banking system, the gold standard, railroads, and high tariffs. It did not openly oppose slavery in the Southern states before the start of the American Civil War—stating that it only opposed the spread of slavery into the territories or into the Northern states—but was widely seen as sympathetic to the abolitionist cause. Seeing a future threat to the practice with the election of Abraham Lincoln, the first Republican president, many states in the South declared secession and joined the Confederacy. Under the leadership of Lincoln and a Republican Congress, it led the fight to destroy the Confederacy during the American Civil War, preserving the Union and abolishing slavery. The aftermath saw the party largely dominate the national political scene until 1932.

In 1912, former Republican president Theodore Roosevelt formed the Progressive ("Bull Moose") Party after being rejected by the GOP and ran unsuccessfully as a third-party presidential candidate, feeling that William Howard Taft had betrayed the values of the Republican Party and calling for social reforms similar to those he had enacted during his presidency. After 1912, many Roosevelt supporters left the Republican Party, and the Party underwent an ideological shift to the right, beginning its 20th-century trend towards conservatism. The GOP lost its congressional majorities during the Great Depression (1929–1940) when the Democrats' New Deal programs proved popular. Dwight D. Eisenhower presided over a period of economic prosperity after the war. Following the Great Society era of progressive legislation under Lyndon B. Johnson, the Southern states became increasingly Republican and the Northeastern states became increasingly Democratic. After the Supreme Court's 1973 decision in Roe v. Wade, the Republican Party opposed abortion in its party platform and grew its support among evangelicals. Richard Nixon carried 49 states in 1972 with his silent majority, even as the Watergate scandal dogged his campaign leading to his resignation. After Gerald Ford pardoned Nixon, he lost reelection and the Republicans would not regain power and realign the political landscape once more until 1980 with the election of Reagan, who brought together advocates of free-market economics, social conservatives, and Soviet Union hawks in a "three leg stool".

As of the 2020s, the party does best among voters who lack postgraduate degrees; live in rural, ex-urban, or small town areas; are married, men, or White; or are evangelical Christians or Latter Day Saints. While it does not receive the majority of the votes of most racial and sexual minorities, it does among Cuban and Vietnamese voters. Since the 1980s, the party has gained support among members of the white working class while it has lost support among affluent and college-educated whites. Since 2012, it has gained support among minorities, particularly working-class Asians and Hispanic/Latino Americans. The party's dominant ideology is American conservatism, with the party generally supporting policies that favor limited government, individualism, traditionalism, republicanism, and limited federal governmental power in relation to the states. Like the Democratic Party, it has taken widely variant and often opposing positions on abortion, trade, immigration, and foreign policy throughout its history.

The Republican Party is a member of the International Democrat Union, an international alliance of centre-right political parties. It has several prominent political wings, including a student wing, the College Republicans; a women's wing, the National Federation of Republican Women, and an LGBT wing, the Log Cabin Republicans. Six of the nine sitting U.S. Supreme Court justices were appointed by Republican presidents. Its most recent presidential nominee was Donald Trump, who was the 45th U.S. president from 2017 to 2021. There have been 19 Republican presidents, the most from any one political party.

Factions 
 

The Republican Party includes several factions. In the 21st century, Republican factions include conservatives, right-libertarians, centrists, and populists. There are significant divisions within the party on the issues of abortion, same-sex marriage, and free trade.

Conservative 
Since Ronald Reagan's presidential election in 1980, American conservatism has been the dominant faction of the Republican Party. Most modern conservatives combine support for free-market economic policies with social conservatism and a hawkish approach to foreign policy. They generally support policies that favor limited government, individualism, traditionalism, republicanism, and limited federal governmental power in relation to the states.

Right-libertarianism 

The Republican Party has a significant right-libertarian faction. Barry Goldwater had a substantial impact on the conservative-libertarian movement of the 1960s. Compared to other Republicans, they are more likely to favor the legalization of marijuana, LGBT rights such as same-sex marriage, gun rights, oppose mass surveillance, and support reforms to current laws surrounding civil asset forfeiture. Right-wing libertarians are strongly divided on the subject of abortion. 

Prominent libertarian conservatives within the Republican Party include New Hampshire Governor Chris Sununu, Kentucky Representative Thomas Massie and Senator Rand Paul, along with Wyoming senator Cynthia Lummis.

Religious right and populism 

Compared to other Republicans, the religious right and right-wing populist faction of the party is more likely to oppose LGBT rights, legalization of marijuana, immigration, free trade, and environmental protection laws. Prominent examples include Donald Trump, Lauren Boebert, and Marjorie Taylor Greene.

Since the 1980s, opposition to abortion has become strongest in the party among conservative Protestant evangelicals. With the possible exception of the ordeal of the bitter water in Numbers 5:11–31, the Bible does not mention the topic of abortion or explicitly take a position on the practice, although several verses have been interpreted as supporting or opposing the ethics of abortion. Initially, evangelicals were relatively indifferent to the cause of abortion and overwhelmingly viewed it as a concern that was sectarian and Catholic. Historian Randall Balmer notes that Billy Graham's Christianity Today published in 1968 a statement by theologian Bruce Waltke that: "God does not regard the fetus as a soul, no matter how far gestation has progressed. The Law plainly exacts: “If a man kills any human life he will be put to death” (Lev. 24:17). But according to Exodus 21:22-24, the destruction of the fetus is not a capital offense. … Clearly, then, in contrast to the mother, the fetus is not reckoned as a soul." Typical of the time, Christianity Today "refused to characterize abortion as sinful" and cited “individual health, family welfare, and social responsibility” as "justifications for ending a pregnancy." Similar beliefs were held among conservative figures in the Southern Baptist Convention, including W. A. Criswell, who is partially credited with starting the "conservative resurgence" within the organization, who stated: "I have always felt that it was only after a child was born and had a life separate from its mother that it became an individual person and it has always, therefore, seemed to me that what is best for the mother and for the future should be allowed." Balmer argues that evangelical American Christianiy being inherently tied to opposition to abortion is a relatively new occurrence. After the late 1970s, he writes, opinion against abortion among evangelicals rapidly shifted in favor of its prohibition.

Support for Israel is significantly less among younger evangelicals. Between 2018 and 2021, support for Israel among evangelicals aged 18-29 dropped from 75% to 34%.

Centrist 

Notable centrist Republicans include Vermont governor Phil Scott, former Massachusetts governor Charlie Baker, and former Maryland governor Larry Hogan.

Historical 
During the 19th century, Republican factions included the Radical Republicans, who advocated the immediate and total abolition of slavery, and later civil rights for freed slaves during the Reconstruction era;  Half-Breeds, who supported civil service reform; and the Stalwarts, who supported machine politics. 

In the 20th century, Republican factions included the Progressive Republicans, the Reagan coalition, and the liberal Rockefeller Republicans.

History

19th century 

The Republican Party was founded in the northern states in 1854 by forces opposed to the expansion of slavery, ex-Whigs and ex-Free Soilers. The Republican Party quickly became the principal opposition to the dominant Democratic Party and the briefly popular Know Nothing Party. The party grew out of opposition to the Kansas–Nebraska Act, which repealed the Missouri Compromise and opened Kansas Territory and Nebraska Territory to slavery and future admission as slave states.  They denounced the expansion of slavery as a great evil, but did not call for ending it in the southern states. While opposition to the expansion of slavery was the most consequential  founding  principal of the party, like the Whig party it replaced, Republicans also called for economic and social modernization.

The first public meeting of the general anti-Nebraska movement, at which the name Republican was proposed, was held on March 20, 1854, at the Little White Schoolhouse in Ripon, Wisconsin. The name was partly chosen to pay homage to Thomas Jefferson's Democratic-Republican Party. The first official party convention was held on July 6, 1854, in Jackson, Michigan.

The party emerged from the great political realignment of the mid-1850s. Historian William Gienapp argues that the great realignment of the 1850s began before the Whigs' collapse, and was caused not by politicians but by voters at the local level. The central forces were ethno-cultural, involving tensions between pietistic Protestants versus liturgical Catholics, Lutherans and Episcopalians regarding Catholicism, prohibition and nativism.  The Know Nothing Party embodied the social forces at work, but its weak leadership was unable to solidify its organization, and the Republicans picked it apart. Nativism was so powerful that the Republicans could not avoid it, but they did minimize it and turn voter wrath against the threat that slave owners would buy up the good farm lands wherever slavery was allowed. The realignment was powerful because it forced voters to switch parties, as typified by the rise and fall of the Know Nothings, the rise of the Republican Party and the splits in the Democratic Party.

At the 1856 Republican National Convention, the party adopted a national platform emphasizing opposition to the expansion of slavery into the territories. While Republican nominee John C. Frémont lost the 1856 United States presidential election to Democrat James Buchanan, Buchanan only managed to win four of the fourteen northern states, winning his home state of Pennsylvania narrowly. Republicans fared better in Congressional and local elections, but Know Nothing candidates took a significant number of seats, creating an awkward three party arrangement. Despite the loss of the presidency and the lack of a majority in Congress, Republicans were able to orchestrate a Republican Speaker of the House, which went to Nathaniel P. Banks. Historian James M. McPherson writes regarding Banks' speakership that "if any one moment marked the birth of the Republican party, this was it."

The Republicans were eager for the elections of 1860. Former Illinois Representative Abraham Lincoln spent several years building support within the party, campaigning heavily for Frémont in 1856 and making a bid for the Senate in 1858, losing to Democrat Stephen A. Douglas but gaining national attention for the Lincoln–Douglas debates it produced. At the 1860 Republican National Convention, Lincoln consolidated support among opponents of New York Senator William H. Seward, a fierce abolitionist who some Republicans feared would be too radical for crucial states such as Pennsylvania and Indiana, as well as those who disapproved of his support for Irish immigrants. Lincoln won on the third ballot and was ultimately elected president in the general election in a rematch against Douglas. Lincoln had not been on the ballot in a single southern state, and even if the vote for Democrats had not been split between Douglas, John C. Breckinridge and John Bell, the Republicans would've still won but without the popular vote. This election result helped kickstart the American Civil War which lasted from 1861 until 1865.

The election of 1864 united War Democrats with the GOP and saw Lincoln and Tennessee Democratic Senator Andrew Johnson get nominated on the National Union Party ticket; Lincoln was re-elected.  By June 1865, slavery was dead in the ex-Confederate states, but still existed in some border states. Under Republican congressional leadership, the Thirteenth Amendment to the United States Constitution—which banned slavery in the United States—passed in 1865; it was ratified in December 1865.

Reconstruction, the gold standard and the Gilded Age

Radical Republicans during Lincoln's presidency felt he was too moderate in his eradication of slavery and opposed his ten percent plan. Radical Republicans passed the Wade–Davis Bill in 1864, which sought to enforce the taking of the Ironclad Oath for all former Confederates. Lincoln vetoed the bill, believing it would jeopardize the peaceful reintegration of the Confederate states into the United States.

Following the assassination of Lincoln, Johnson ascended to the presidency and was deplored by Radical Republicans. Johnson was vitriolic in his criticisms of the Radical Republicans during a national tour ahead of the 1866 midterm elections.  Anti-Johnson Republicans won a two-thirds majority in both chambers of Congress following the elections, which helped lead the way toward his impeachment and near ouster from office in 1868. That same year, former Union Army General Ulysses S. Grant was elected as the next Republican president.

Grant was a Radical Republican which created some division within the party, some such as Massachusetts Senator Charles Sumner and Illinois Senator Lyman Trumbull opposed most of his Reconstructionist policies. Others found contempt with the large-scale corruption present in Grant's administration, with the emerging Stalwart faction defending Grant and the spoils system, whereas the Half-Breeds pushed for reform of the civil service. Republicans who opposed Grant branched off to form the Liberal Republican Party, nominating Horace Greeley in 1872. The Democratic Party attempted to capitalize on this divide in the GOP by co-nominating Greeley under their party banner. Greeley's positions proved inconsistent with the Liberal Republican Party that nominated him, with Greeley supporting high tariffs despite the party's opposition. Grant was easily re-elected.

The 1876 general election saw a contentious conclusion as both parties claimed victory despite three southern states still not officially declaring a winner at the end of election day. Voter suppression had occurred in the south to depress the black and white Republican vote, which gave Republican-controlled returning officers enough of a reason to declare that fraud, intimidation and violence had soiled the states' results. They proceeded to throw out enough Democratic votes for Republican Rutherford B. Hayes to be declared the winner. Still, Democrats refused to accept the results and an Electoral Commission made up of members of Congress was established to decide who would be awarded the states' electors. After the Commission voted along party lines in Hayes' favor, Democrats threatened to delay the counting of electoral votes indefinitely so no president would be inaugurated on March 4. This resulted in the Compromise of 1877 and Hayes finally became president.

Hayes doubled down on the gold standard, which had been signed into law by Grant with the Coinage Act of 1873, as a solution to the depressed American economy in the aftermath of the Panic of 1873. He also believed greenbacks posed a threat; greenbacks being money printed during the Civil War that was not backed by specie, which Hayes objected to as a proponent of hard money. Hayes sought to restock the country's gold supply, which by January 1879 succeeded as gold was more frequently exchanged for greenbacks compared to greenbacks being exchanged for gold. Ahead of the 1880 general election, Republican James G. Blaine ran for the party nomination supporting Hayes' gold standard push and supporting his civil reforms. Both falling short of the nomination, Blaine and opponent John Sherman backed Republican James A. Garfield, who agreed with Hayes' move in favor of the gold standard, but opposed his civil reform efforts.

Garfield was elected but assassinated early into his term, however his death helped create support for the Pendleton Civil Service Reform Act, which was passed in 1883; the bill was signed into law by Republican President Chester A. Arthur, who succeeded Garfield.

Blaine once again ran for the presidency, winning the nomination but losing to Democrat Grover Cleveland in 1884, the first Democrat to be elected president since Buchanan. Dissident Republicans, known as Mugwumps, had defected Blaine due to corruption which had plagued his political career. Cleveland stuck to the gold standard policy, which eased most Republicans, but he came into conflict with the party regarding budding American imperialism. Republican Benjamin Harrison was able to reclaim the presidency from Cleveland in 1888. During his presidency, Harrison signed the Dependent and Disability Pension Act, which established pensions for all veterans of the Union who had served for more than 90 days and were unable to perform manual labor.

A majority of Republicans supported the annexation of Hawaii, under the new governance of Republican Sanford B. Dole, and Harrison, following his loss in 1892 to Cleveland, attempted to pass a treaty annexing Hawaii before Cleveland was to be inaugurated again. Cleveland opposed annexation, though Democrats were split geographically on the issue, with most northeastern Democrats proving to be the strongest voices of opposition.

In 1896, Republican William McKinley's platform supported the gold standard and high tariffs, having been the creator and namesake for the McKinley Tariff of 1890. Though having been divided on the issue prior to the 1896 Republican National Convention, McKinley decided to heavily favor the gold standard over free silver in his campaign messaging, but promised to continue bimetallism to ward off continued skepticism over the gold standard, which had lingered since the Panic of 1893. Democrat William Jennings Bryan proved to be a devoted adherent to the free silver movement, which cost Bryan the support of Democrat institutions such as Tammany Hall, the New York World and a large majority of the Democratic Party's upper and middle-class support. McKinley defeated Bryan and returned the White House to Republican control until 1912.

20th century

Progressives vs Standpatters

The 1896 realignment cemented the Republicans as the party of big businesses while Theodore Roosevelt added more small business support by his embrace of trust busting. He handpicked his successor William Howard Taft in 1908, but they became enemies as the party split down the middle. Taft defeated Roosevelt for the 1912 nomination so Roosevelt stormed out of the convention and started a new party. Roosevelt ran on the ticket of his new Progressive ("Bull Moose") Party. He called for social reforms, many of which were later championed by New Deal Democrats in the 1930s. He lost and when most of his supporters returned to the GOP they found they did not agree with the new conservative economic thinking, leading to an ideological shift to the right in the Republican Party.

The Republicans returned to the White House throughout the 1920s, running on platforms of normalcy, business-oriented efficiency and high tariffs. The national party platform avoided mention of prohibition, instead issuing a vague commitment to law and order.

Warren G. Harding, Calvin Coolidge and Herbert Hoover were resoundingly elected in 1920, 1924 and 1928, respectively. The Teapot Dome scandal threatened to hurt the party, but Harding died and the opposition splintered in 1924. The pro-business policies of the decade seemed to produce an unprecedented prosperity until the Wall Street Crash of 1929 heralded the Great Depression.

Roosevelt New Deal era 

The New Deal coalition forged by Democrat Franklin D. Roosevelt controlled American politics for most of the next three decades, excluding the two-term presidency of Republican Dwight D. Eisenhower. After Roosevelt took office in 1933, New Deal legislation sailed through Congress and the economy moved sharply upward from its nadir in early 1933. However, long-term unemployment remained a drag until 1940. In the 1934 midterm elections, 10 Republican senators went down to defeat, leaving the GOP with only 25 senators against 71 Democrats. The House of Representatives likewise had overwhelming Democratic majorities.

The Republican Party factionalized into a majority "Old Right" (based in the midwest) and a liberal wing based in the northeast that supported much of the New Deal. The Old Right sharply attacked the "Second New Deal" and said it represented class warfare and socialism. Roosevelt was re-elected in a landslide in 1936; however, as his second term began, the economy declined, strikes soared, and he failed to take control of the Supreme Court and purge the southern conservatives from the Democratic Party. Republicans made a major comeback in the 1938 elections and had new rising stars such as Robert A. Taft of Ohio on the right and Thomas E. Dewey of New York on the left. Southern conservatives joined with most Republicans to form the conservative coalition, which dominated domestic issues in Congress until 1964. Both parties split on foreign policy issues, with the anti-war isolationists dominant in the Republican Party and the interventionists who wanted to stop Adolf Hitler dominant in the Democratic Party. Roosevelt won a third and fourth term in 1940 and 1944, respectively. Conservatives abolished most of the New Deal during the war, but they did not attempt to do away with Social Security or the agencies that regulated business.

Historian George H. Nash argues: Unlike the "moderate", internationalist, largely eastern bloc of Republicans who accepted (or at least acquiesced in) some of the "Roosevelt Revolution" and the essential premises of President Harry S. Truman's foreign policy, the Republican Right at heart was counterrevolutionary. Anti-collectivist, anti-Communist, anti-New Deal, passionately committed to limited government, free market economics, and congressional (as opposed to executive) prerogatives, the G.O.P. conservatives were obliged from the start to wage a constant two-front war: against liberal Democrats from without and "me-too" Republicans from within.

After 1945, the internationalist wing of the GOP cooperated with Truman's Cold War foreign policy, funded the Marshall Plan and supported NATO, despite the continued isolationism of the Old Right.

Second half of the Twentieth Century

Post-Roosevelt New Deal Era (1945–1964) 
The second half of the 20th century saw the election or succession of Republican presidents Dwight D. Eisenhower, Richard Nixon, Gerald Ford, Ronald Reagan and George H. W. Bush. Eisenhower had defeated conservative leader Senator Robert A. Taft for the 1952 nomination, but conservatives dominated the domestic policies of the Eisenhower administration. Voters liked Eisenhower much more than they liked the GOP and he proved unable to shift the party to a more moderate position. Since 1976, liberalism has virtually faded out of the Republican Party, apart from a few northeastern holdouts.

Goldwater to Reagan (1964–1980) 

Historians cite the 1964 United States presidential election and its respective 1964 Republican National Convention as a significant shift, which saw the conservative wing, helmed by Senator Barry Goldwater of Arizona, battle the liberal New York Governor Nelson Rockefeller and his eponymous Rockefeller Republican faction for the party presidential nomination. With Goldwater poised to win, Rockefeller, urged to mobilize his liberal faction, relented, "You’re looking at it, buddy. I’m all that’s left." Though Goldwater lost in a landslide, Reagan would make himself known as a prominent supporter of his throughout the campaign, delivering the "A Time for Choosing" speech for him. He'd go on to become governor of California two years later, and in 1980, win the presidency.

Reagan Era (1980–1994) 
The presidency of Reagan, lasting from 1981 to 1989, constituted what is known as the "Reagan Revolution'. It was seen as a fundamental shift from the stagflation of the 1970s preceding it, with the introduction of Reaganomics intended to cut taxes, prioritize government deregulation and shift funding from the domestic sphere into the military to check the Soviet Union by utilizing deterrence theory. During a visit to then-West Berlin in June 1987, he addressed Soviet leader Mikhail Gorbachev during a speech at the Berlin Wall, demanding that he "tear down this wall". The remark was ignored at the time but after the fall of the wall in 1989 retroactively recast as a soaring achievement over the years.

After he left office in 1989, Reagan became an iconic conservative Republican. Republican presidential candidates would frequently claim to share his views and aim to establish themselves and their policies as the more appropriate heir to his legacy.

Vice President Bush scored a landslide in the 1988 general election. However his term would see a divide form within the Republican Party. Bush's vision of economic liberalization and international cooperation with foreign nations saw the negotiation and signing of the North American Free Trade Agreement (NAFTA) and the conceptual beginnings of the World Trade Organization. Independent politician and businessman Ross Perot decried NAFTA and prophesied it would lead to outsourcing American jobs to Mexico, while Democrat Bill Clinton found agreement in Bush's policies. Bush lost reelection in 1992 with 37 percent of the popular vote, with Clinton garnering a plurality of 43 percent and Perot in third with 19 percent. While debatable if Perot's candidacy cost Bush reelection, Charlie Cook of The Cook Political Report attests Perot's messaging held more weight with Republican and conservative voters at-large. Perot formed the Reform Party and those who had been or would become prominent Republicans saw brief membership, such as former White House Communications Director Pat Buchanan and later President Donald Trump.

Gingrich Revolution (1994–2000) 

In the Republican Revolution of 1994, the party—led by House Minority Whip Newt Gingrich, who campaigned on the "Contract with America"—won majorities in both chambers of Congress, gained 12 governorships and regained control of 20 state legislatures. (However, most voters had not heard of the Contract and the Republican victory was attributed to redistricting, traditional mid-term anti-incumbent voting,  and Republicans becoming the majority party in Dixie for the first time since Reconstruction.) It was the first time the Republican Party had achieved a majority in the House since 1952. Gingrich was made Speaker of the House, and within the first 100 days of the Republican majority every proposition featured in the Contract with America was passed, with the exception of term limits for members of Congress, which did not pass in the Senate. One key to Gingrich's success in 1994 was nationalizing the election, which in turn led to Gingrich's becoming a national figure during the 1996 House elections, with many Democratic leaders proclaiming Gingrich was a zealous radical. The Republicans maintained their majority for the first time since 1928 despite the presidential ticket of Bob Dole-Jack Kemp losing handily to President Clinton in the general election. However, Gingrich's national profile proved a detriment to the Republican Congress, which enjoyed majority approval among voters in spite of Gingrich's relative unpopularity.

After Gingrich and the Republicans struck a deal with Clinton on the Balanced Budget Act of 1997 with added tax cuts included, the Republican House majority had difficulty convening on a new agenda ahead of the 1998 midterm elections. During the ongoing impeachment of Bill Clinton in 1998, Gingrich decided to make Clinton's misconduct the party message heading into the midterms, believing it would add to their majority. The strategy proved mistaken and the Republicans lost five seats, though whether it was due to poor messaging or Clinton's popularity providing a coattail effect is debated. Gingrich was ousted from party power due to the performance, ultimately deciding to resign from Congress altogether. For a short time afterward, it appeared Louisiana Representative Bob Livingston would become his successor; Livingston, however, stepped down from consideration and resigned from Congress after damaging reports of affairs threatened the Republican House's legislative agenda if he were to serve as Speaker. Illinois Representative Dennis Hastert was promoted to Speaker in Livingston's place, and served in that position until 2007.

21st century

George W. Bush (2001–2009) 
A Republican ticket of George W. Bush and Dick Cheney won the 2000 and 2004 presidential elections. Bush campaigned as a "compassionate conservative" in 2000, wanting to better appeal to immigrants and minority voters. The goal was to prioritize drug rehabilitation programs and aid for prisoner reentry into society, a move intended to capitalize on President Bill Clinton's tougher crime initiatives such as his administration's 1994 crime bill. The platform failed to gain much traction among members of the party during his presidency.

With the inauguration of Bush as president, the Republican Party remained fairly cohesive for much of the 2000s, as both strong economic libertarians and social conservatives opposed the Democrats, whom they saw as the party of bloated, secular, and liberal government. This period saw the rise of "pro-government conservatives"—a core part of the Bush's base—a considerable group of the Republicans who advocated for increased government spending and greater regulations covering both the economy and people's personal lives, as well as for an activist and interventionist foreign policy. Survey groups such as the Pew Research Center found that social conservatives and free market advocates remained the other two main groups within the party's coalition of support, with all three being roughly equal in number. However, libertarians and libertarian-leaning conservatives increasingly found fault with what they saw as Republicans' restricting of vital civil liberties while corporate welfare and the national debt hiked considerably under Bush's tenure. In contrast, some social conservatives expressed dissatisfaction with the party's support for economic policies that conflicted with their moral values.

The Republican Party lost its Senate majority in 2001 when the Senate became split evenly; nevertheless, the Republicans maintained control of the Senate due to the tie-breaking vote of Vice President Cheney. Democrats gained control of the Senate on June 6, 2001, when Republican Senator Jim Jeffords of Vermont switched his party affiliation to Democrat. The Republicans regained the Senate majority in the 2002 elections, and Republican majorities in the House and Senate were held until the Democrats regained control of both chambers in the mid-term elections of 2006.

In 2008, Republican Senator John McCain of Arizona and Governor Sarah Palin of Alaska were defeated by Democratic Senators Barack Obama and Joe Biden of Illinois and Delaware, respectively.

Modernity (2010–present)

Tea Party Revolt (2010–2016) 
The Republicans experienced electoral success in the wave election of 2010, which coincided with the ascendancy of the Tea Party movement, an anti-Obama protest movement of fiscal conservatives. Members of the movement called for lower taxes, and for a reduction of the national debt of the United States and federal budget deficit through decreased government spending. It was also described as a popular constitutional movement composed of a mixture of libertarian, right-wing populist, and conservative activism. That success began with the upset win of Scott Brown in the Massachusetts special Senate election for a seat that had been held for decades by the Democratic Kennedy brothers. In the November elections, Republicans recaptured control of the House, increased their number of seats in the Senate and gained a majority of governorships. The Tea Party would go on to strongly influence the Republican Party, in part due to the replacement of establishment Republicans with Tea Party-style Republicans.

When Obama and Biden won re-election in 2012, defeating a Mitt Romney-Paul Ryan ticket, the Republicans lost seven seats in the House in the November congressional elections, but still retained control of that chamber. However, Republicans were not able to gain control of the Senate, continuing their minority status with a net loss of two seats. In the aftermath of the loss, some prominent Republicans spoke out against their own party. A 2012 election post-mortem by the Republican Party concluded that the party needed to do more on the national level to attract votes from minorities and young voters. In March 2013, National Committee Chairman Reince Priebus gave a stinging report on the party's electoral failures in 2012, calling on Republicans to reinvent themselves and officially endorse immigration reform. He said: "There's no one reason we lost. Our message was weak; our ground game was insufficient; we weren't inclusive; we were behind in both data and digital, and our primary and debate process needed improvement." He proposed 219 reforms, including a $10 million marketing campaign to reach women, minority demographics, and gay people, the setting of a shorter, more controlled primary season, and creating better data collection facilities.

Following the 2014 midterm elections, the Republican Party took control of the Senate by gaining nine seats. With a final total of 247 seats (57%) in the House and 54 seats in the Senate, the Republicans ultimately achieved their largest majority in the Congress since the 71st Congress in 1929.

Donald Trump presidency (2016–2020) 

The election of Republican Donald Trump to the presidency in 2016 marked a populist shift in the Republican Party. Trump's defeat of Democratic candidate Hillary Clinton was unexpected, as polls had shown Clinton leading the race. Trump's victory was fueled by narrow victories in three states—Michigan, Pennsylvania and Wisconsin—that had traditionally been part of the Democratic blue wall for decades. According to NBC News, "Trump's power famously came from his 'silent majority'—working-class white voters who felt mocked and ignored by an establishment, loosely defined by special interests in Washington, news outlets in New York and tastemakers in Hollywood. He built trust within that base by abandoning Republican establishment orthodoxy on issues like trade and government spending in favor of a broader nationalist message".

After the 2016 elections, Republicans maintained a majority in the Senate, House, and state governorships, and wielded newly acquired executive power with Trump's election as president. The Republican Party controlled 69 of 99 state legislative chambers in 2017, the most it had held in history; and at least 33 governorships, the most it had held since 1922. The party had total control of government (legislative chambers and governorship) in 25 states, the most since 1952; the opposing Democratic Party had full control in only five states. Following the results of the 2018 midterm elections, the Republicans lost control of the House but strengthened their hold of the Senate.

Over the course of his term, Trump appointed three justices to the Supreme Court: Neil Gorsuch, Brett Kavanaugh and Amy Coney Barrett – the most appointments of any president in a single term since fellow Republican Richard Nixon. He appointed 260 judges in total, creating overall Republican-appointed majorities on every branch of the federal judiciary except for the Court of International Trade by the time he left office, shifting the judiciary to the right. Other notable achievements during his presidency included the passing of the Tax Cuts and Jobs Act in 2017, the creation of the United States Space Force – the first new independent military service since 1947 – and the brokering of the Abraham Accords, a series of normalization agreements between Israel and various Arab states. The Republican Party did not produce an official party platform ahead of the 2020 elections, instead simply endorsing "the President's America-first agenda", which prompted comparisons to contemporary leader-focused party platforms in Russia and China. Trump was impeached by the House of Representatives on December 18, 2019, on the charges of abuse of power and obstruction of Congress. He was acquitted by the Senate on February 5, 2020. Trump lost reelection to Joe Biden in 2020 but refused to concede, claiming widespread electoral fraud and attempting to overturn the results, to which many attribute the U.S. Capitol being attacked by his supporters on January 6, 2021. Following the attack, the House impeached Trump for a second time on the charge of incitement of insurrection, making him the only federal officeholder in the history of the United States to be impeached twice. He left office on January 20, 2021, but the impeachment trial continued into the early weeks of the Biden administration, with Trump ultimately being acquitted a second time by the Senate on February 13, 2021.

Biden presidency (2021–present) 
In 2022, Supreme Court justices appointed by Trump proved decisive in landmark decisions on gun rights and abortion. Republicans went into that year's midterm elections confident and with most election analysts predicting a red wave, but the party underperformed heavily, with voters in swing states and competitive districts  joining Democrats in rejecting candidates endorsed by Trump or that denied the results of the 2020 election. The party won the House but with a narrow majority when a large one had been expected for most of the cycle, and lost the Senate, leading to many Republicans and conservative thought leaders questioning whether Trump should continue as the party's main figurehead and leader. Florida governor Ron DeSantis, who won reelection in a historic landslide and was considered by many analysts as the midterms' biggest winner, was the most frequently discussed name as the future party leader.

Name and symbols 

The party's founding members chose the name Republican Party in the mid-1850s as homage to the values of republicanism promoted by Thomas Jefferson's Democratic-Republican Party. The idea for the name came from an editorial by the party's leading publicist, Horace Greeley, who called for "some simple name like 'Republican' [that] would more fitly designate those who had united to restore the Union to its true mission of champion and promulgator of Liberty rather than propagandist of slavery". The name reflects the 1776 republican values of civic virtue and opposition to aristocracy and corruption. It is important to note that "republican" has a variety of meanings around the world, and the Republican Party has evolved such that the meanings no longer always align.

The term "Grand Old Party" is a traditional nickname for the Republican Party, and the abbreviation "GOP" is a commonly used designation. The term originated in 1875 in the Congressional Record, referring to the party associated with the successful military defense of the Union as "this gallant old party". The following year in an article in the Cincinnati Commercial, the term was modified to "grand old party". The first use of the abbreviation is dated 1884.

The traditional mascot of the party is the elephant. A political cartoon by Thomas Nast, published in Harper's Weekly on November 7, 1874, is considered the first important use of the symbol. An alternate symbol of the Republican Party in states such as Indiana, New York and Ohio is the bald eagle as opposed to the Democratic rooster or the Democratic five-pointed star. In Kentucky, the log cabin is a symbol of the Republican Party (not related to the gay Log Cabin Republicans organization).

Traditionally the party had no consistent color identity. After the 2000 election, the color red became associated with Republicans. During and after the election, the major broadcast networks used the same color scheme for the electoral map: states won by Republican nominee George W. Bush were colored red and states won by Democratic nominee Al Gore were colored blue. Due to the weeks-long dispute over the election results, these color associations became firmly ingrained, persisting in subsequent years. Although the assignment of colors to political parties is unofficial and informal, the media has come to represent the respective political parties using these colors. The party and its candidates have also come to embrace the color red.

Political positions

Economic policies 

Republicans believe that free markets and individual achievement are the primary factors behind economic prosperity. Republicans frequently advocate in favor of fiscal conservatism during Democratic administrations; however, they have shown themselves willing to increase federal debt when they are in charge of the government (the implementation of the Bush tax cuts, Medicare Part D and the Tax Cuts and Jobs Act of 2017 are examples of this willingness). Despite pledges to roll back government spending, Republican administrations have, since the late 1960s, sustained or increased previous levels of government spending.

Taxes

The modern Republican Party's economic policy positions, as measured by votes in Congress, tend to align with business interests and the affluent. Modern Republicans advocate the theory of supply-side economics, which holds that lower tax rates increase economic growth. Many Republicans oppose higher tax rates for higher earners, which they believe are unfairly targeted at those who create jobs and wealth. They believe private spending is more efficient than government spending. Republican lawmakers have also sought to limit funding for tax enforcement and tax collection. At the national level and state level, Republicans tend to pursue policies of tax cuts and deregulation.

Welfare

Republicans believe individuals should take responsibility for their own circumstances. They also believe the private sector is more effective in helping the poor through charity than the government is through welfare programs and that social assistance programs often cause government dependency. As of November 2022, all eleven States that have not expanded Medicaid have Republican-controlled state legislatures.

Labor unions
Republicans believe corporations should be able to establish their own employment practices, including benefits and wages, with the free market deciding the price of work. Since the 1920s, Republicans have generally been opposed by labor union organizations and members. At the national level, Republicans supported the Taft–Hartley Act of 1947, which gives workers the right not to participate in unions. Modern Republicans at the state level generally support various right-to-work laws, which prohibit union security agreements requiring all workers in a unionized workplace to pay dues or a fair-share fee, regardless of whether they are members of the union or not.

Minimum wage

Most Republicans oppose increases in the minimum wage, believing that such increases hurt businesses by forcing them to cut and outsource jobs while passing on costs to consumers.

Environmental policies 

Historically, progressive leaders in the Republican Party supported environmental protection. Republican President Theodore Roosevelt was a prominent conservationist whose policies eventually led to the creation of the National Park Service. While Republican President Richard Nixon was not an environmentalist, he signed legislation to create the Environmental Protection Agency in 1970 and had a comprehensive environmental program. However, this position has changed since the 1980s and the administration of President Ronald Reagan, who labeled environmental regulations a burden on the economy. Since then, Republicans have increasingly taken positions against environmental regulation, with many Republicans rejecting the scientific consensus on climate change.

In 2006, then-California Governor Arnold Schwarzenegger broke from Republican orthodoxy to sign several bills imposing caps on carbon emissions in California. Then-President George W. Bush opposed mandatory caps at a national level. Bush's decision not to regulate carbon dioxide as a pollutant was challenged in the Supreme Court by 12 states, with the court ruling against the Bush administration in 2007. Bush also publicly opposed ratification of the Kyoto Protocols which sought to limit greenhouse gas emissions and thereby combat climate change; his position was heavily criticized by climate scientists.

The Republican Party rejects cap-and-trade policy to limit carbon emissions. In the 2000s, Senator John McCain proposed bills (such as the McCain-Lieberman Climate Stewardship Act) that would have regulated carbon emissions, but his position on climate change was unusual among high-ranking party members. Some Republican candidates have supported the development of alternative fuels in order to achieve energy independence for the United States. Some Republicans support increased oil drilling in protected areas such as the Arctic National Wildlife Refuge, a position that has drawn criticism from activists.

Many Republicans during the presidency of Barack Obama opposed his administration's new environmental regulations, such as those on carbon emissions from coal. In particular, many Republicans supported building the Keystone Pipeline; this position was supported by businesses, but opposed by indigenous peoples' groups and environmental activists.

According to the Center for American Progress, a non-profit liberal advocacy group, more than 55% of congressional Republicans were climate change deniers in 2014. PolitiFact in May 2014 found "relatively few Republican members of Congress ... accept the prevailing scientific conclusion that global warming is both real and man-made." The group found eight members who acknowledged it, although the group acknowledged there could be more and that not all members of Congress have taken a stance on the issue.

From 2008 to 2017, the Republican Party went from "debating how to combat human-caused climate change to arguing that it does not exist", according to The New York Times. In January 2015, the Republican-led U.S. Senate voted 98–1 to pass a resolution acknowledging that "climate change is real and is not a hoax"; however, an amendment stating that "human activity significantly contributes to climate change" was supported by only five Republican senators.

Health care 

The party opposes a single-payer health care system, describing it as socialized medicine. The Republican Party has a mixed record of supporting the historically popular Social Security, Medicare and Medicaid programs, and opposing the Affordable Care Act and expansions of Medicaid. Historically, there have been diverse and overlapping views within both the Republican Party and the Democratic Party on the role of government in health care, but the two parties became highly polarized on the topic during 2008–2009 and onwards. 

Both Republicans and Democrats made various proposals to establish federally funded aged health insurance prior to the bipartisan effort to establish Medicare and Medicaid in 1965. The Republican Party opposes the Affordable Care Act, with no Republican member of Congress voting for it in 2009 and frequent subsequent attempts by Republicans to repeal the legislation. At the state level, the party has tended to adopt a position against Medicaid expansion.

According to a 2023 YouGov poll, Republicans are more likely to oppose intersex medical alterations than Democrats.

Foreign policy 
The Republican Party has a persistent history of skepticism and opposition to multilateralism in American foreign policy. Neoconservatism, which supports unilateralism and emphasizes the use of force and hawkishness in American foreign policy, has been a prominent strand of foreign policy thinking in all Republican presidential administration since Ronald Reagan's presidency. Some, including paleoconservatives, call for non-interventionism and an America First foreign policy. This faction gained strength starting in 2016 with the rise of Donald Trump.

War on terror
Since the terrorist attacks on September 11, 2001, many in the party have supported neoconservative policies with regard to the War on Terror, including the  War in Afghanistan and the Iraq War. The George W. Bush administration took the position that the Geneva Conventions do not apply to unlawful combatants, while other prominent Republicans, such as Ted Cruz, strongly oppose the use of enhanced interrogation techniques, which they view as torture.

Foreign aid
Republicans have frequently advocated for restricting foreign aid as a means of asserting the national security and immigration interests of the United States.

Foreign relations
The Republican Party generally supports a strong alliance with Israel and efforts to secure peace in the Middle East between Israel and its Arab neighbors. In recent years, Republicans have begun to move away from the two-state solution approach to resolving the Israeli–Palestinian conflict. In a 2014 poll, 59% of Republicans favored doing less abroad and focusing on the country's own problems instead.

According to the 2016 platform, the party's stance on the status of Taiwan is: "We oppose any unilateral steps by either side to alter the status quo in the Taiwan Straits on the principle that all issues regarding the island's future must be resolved peacefully, through dialogue, and be agreeable to the people of Taiwan." In addition, if "China were to violate those principles, the United States, in accord with the Taiwan Relations Act, will help Taiwan defend itself".

Social policies 
The Republican Party is generally associated with social conservative policies, although it does have dissenting centrist and libertarian factions. The social conservatives support laws that uphold their traditional values, such as opposition to same-sex marriage, abortion, and marijuana. The Republican Party's positions on social and cultural issues are in part a reflection of the influential role that the Christian right has had in the party since the 1970s. Most conservative Republicans also oppose gun control, affirmative action, and illegal immigration.

Abortion and embryonic stem cell research 
The Republican position on abortion has changed significantly over time.  During the 1960s and early 1970s, opposition to abortion was concentrated among members of the political left and the Democratic Party; most liberal Mainline Protestants and Catholics — both of which tended to vote for the Democratic Party — opposed expanding abortion access while most conservative evangelical Protestants supported it.

During this period, Republicans generally favored legalized abortion more than Democrats, although significant heterogeneity could be found within both parties. Leading Republican political figures such as Ronald Reagan, Richard Nixon, Gerald Ford, George H.W. Bush, took pro-choice positions until the early 1980s. However, starting at this point, both George H.W. Bush and Ronald Reagan described themselves as pro-life during their presidencies. In the 21st century, both George W. Bush and Donald Trump described themselves as "pro-life" during their terms. However, Trump stated that he supported the legality and ethics of abortion before his candidacy in 2015.

Summarizing the rapid shift in the Republican and Democratic positions on abortion, Sue Halpern writes:...in the late 1960s and early 1970s, many Republicans were behind efforts to liberalize and even decriminalize abortion; theirs was the party of reproductive choice, while Democrats, with their large Catholic constituency, were the opposition. Republican governor Ronald Reagan signed the California Therapeutic Abortion Act, one of the most liberal abortion laws in the country, in 1967, legalizing abortion for women whose mental or physical health would be impaired by pregnancy, or whose pregnancies were the result of rape or incest. The same year, the Republican strongholds of North Carolina and Colorado made it easier for women to obtain abortions. New York, under Governor Nelson Rockefeller, a Republican, eliminated all restrictions on women seeking to terminate pregnancies up to twenty-four weeks gestation.... Richard Nixon, Barry Goldwater, Gerald Ford, and George H.W. Bush were all pro-choice, and they were not party outliers. In 1972, a Gallup poll found that 68 percent of Republicans believed abortion to be a private matter between a woman and her doctor. The government, they said, should not be involved...  Today, opinion polls show that Republican voters are heavily divided on the legality of abortion, although vast majority of the party's national and state candidates are anti-abortion and oppose elective abortion on religious or moral grounds. While many advocate exceptions in the case of incest, rape or the mother's life being at risk, in 2012 the party approved a platform advocating banning abortions without exception. There were not highly polarized differences between the Democratic Party and the Republican Party prior to the Roe v. Wade 1973 Supreme Court ruling (which made prohibitions on abortion rights unconstitutional), but after the Supreme Court ruling, opposition to abortion became an increasingly key national platform for the Republican Party. As a result, Evangelicals gravitated towards the Republican Party. Most Republicans oppose government funding for abortion providers, notably Planned Parenthood. This includes support for the Hyde Amendment.

Until its dissolution in 2018, Republican Majority for Choice, an abortion rights PAC, advocated for amending the GOP platform to include pro-abortion rights members.

The Republican Party has pursued policies at the national and state-level to restrict embryonic stem cell research beyond the original lines because it involves the destruction of human embryos.

Affirmative action 
Republicans are generally against affirmative action for women and some minorities, often describing it as a "quota system" and believing that it is not meritocratic and is counter-productive socially by only further promoting discrimination. The GOP's official stance supports race-neutral admissions policies in universities, but supports taking into account the socioeconomic status of the student. The 2012 Republican National Committee platform stated, "We support efforts to help low-income individuals get a fair chance based on their potential and individual merit; but we reject preferences, quotas, and set-asides, as the best or sole methods through which fairness can be achieved, whether in government, education or corporate boardrooms…Merit, ability, aptitude, and results should be the factors that determine advancement in our society.”

Gun ownership 

Republicans generally support gun ownership rights and oppose laws regulating guns. Party members and Republican-leaning independents are twice as likely to own a gun as Democrats and Democratic-leaning independents.

The National Rifle Association, a special interest group in support of gun ownership, has consistently aligned itself with the Republican Party. Following gun control measures under the Clinton administration, such as the Violent Crime Control and Law Enforcement Act of 1994, the Republicans allied with the NRA during the Republican Revolution in 1994. Since then, the NRA has consistently backed Republican candidates and contributed financial support, such as in the 2013 Colorado recall election which resulted in the ousting of two pro-gun control Democrats for two anti-gun control Republicans.

In contrast, George H. W. Bush, formerly a lifelong NRA member, was highly critical of the organization following their response to the Oklahoma City bombing authored by CEO Wayne LaPierre, and publicly resigned in protest.

Drug legalization 

Republican elected officials have historically supported the War on Drugs. They oppose legalization or decriminalization of drugs such as marijuana.

Opposition to the legalization of marijuana has softened significantly over time among Republican voters. A 2021 Quinnipiac poll found that 62% of Republicans supported the legalization of recreational marijuana use and that net support for the position was +30 points.

Immigration 

In the period 1850–1870, the Republican Party was more opposed to immigration than Democrats, in part because the Republican Party relied on the support of anti-Catholic and anti-immigrant parties, such as the Know-Nothings, at the time. In the decades following the Civil War, the Republican Party grew more supportive of immigration, as it represented manufacturers in the northeast (who wanted additional labor) whereas the Democratic Party came to be seen as the party of labor (which wanted fewer laborers to compete with). Starting in the 1970s, the parties switched places again, as the Democrats grew more supportive of immigration than Republicans.

Republicans are divided on how to confront illegal immigration between a platform that allows for migrant workers and a path to citizenship for undocumented immigrants (supported more by the Republican establishment), versus a position focused on securing the border and deporting illegal immigrants (supported by populists). In 2006, the White House supported and Republican-led Senate passed comprehensive immigration reform that would eventually allow millions of illegal immigrants to become citizens, but the House (also led by Republicans) did not advance the bill. After the defeat in the 2012 presidential election, particularly among Latinos, several Republicans advocated a friendlier approach to immigrants. However, in 2016 the field of candidates took a sharp position against illegal immigration, with leading candidate Donald Trump proposing building a wall along the southern border. Proposals calling for immigration reform with a path to citizenship for undocumented immigrants have attracted broad Republican support in some polls. In a 2013 poll, 60% of Republicans supported the pathway concept.

LGBT issues 
Similar to the Democratic Party, the Republican position on LGBT rights has changed significantly over time, and there has been continuously increasing support among both parties on the issue. A strong majority of Republican voters now support same-sex marriage, and public opinion has changed in a significantly favorable direction. However, according to FiveThirtyEight, this growth in support has occurred faster among Republican voters than among party elites and elected politicians.

Both Republican and Democratic politicians predominately took hostile positions on LGBT rights before the 2000s. From the early-2000s to the mid-2010s, Republicans opposed same-sex marriage, while being divided on the issue of civil unions and domestic partnerships for same-sex couples. During the 2004 election, George W. Bush campaigned prominently on a constitutional amendment to prohibit same-sex marriage; many believe it helped Bush win re-election. In both 2004 and 2006, President Bush, Senate Majority Leader Bill Frist, and House Majority Leader John Boehner promoted the Federal Marriage Amendment, a proposed constitutional amendment which would legally restrict the definition of marriage to heterosexual couples. In both attempts, the amendment failed to secure enough votes to invoke cloture and thus ultimately was never passed. As more states legalized same-sex marriage in the 2010s, Republicans increasingly supported allowing each state to decide its own marriage policy. As of 2014, most state GOP platforms expressed opposition to same-sex marriage. The 2016 GOP Platform defined marriage as "natural marriage, the union of one man and one woman," and condemned the Supreme Court's ruling legalizing same-sex marriages. The 2020 platform retained the 2016 language against same-sex marriage. Following his election as president in 2016, Donald Trump stated that he had no objection to same-sex marriage or to the Supreme Court decision in Obergefell v. Hodges, but had previously promised to consider appointing a Supreme Court justice to roll back the constitutional right. In office, Trump was the first sitting Republican president to recognize LGBT Pride Month. Conversely, the Trump administration banned transgender individuals from service in the United States military and rolled back other protections for transgender people which had been enacted during the previous Democratic presidency.

The Republican Party platform previously opposed the inclusion of gay people in the military and opposed adding sexual orientation to the list of protected classes since 1992. The Republican Party opposed the inclusion of sexual preference in anti-discrimination statutes from 1992 to 2004. The 2008 and 2012 Republican Party platform supported anti-discrimination statutes based on sex, race, age, religion, creed, disability, or national origin, but both platforms were silent on sexual orientation and gender identity. The 2016 platform was opposed to sex discrimination statutes that included the phrase "sexual orientation."

On November 6, 2021, RNC Chair Ronna McDaniel announced the creation of the "RNC Pride Coalition," in partnership with the Log Cabin Republicans, to promote outreach to LGBTQ voters. However, after the announcement, McDaniel apologized for not having communicated the announcement in advance and emphasized that the new outreach program does not alter the GOP Platform, last adopted in 2016. The Log Cabin Republicans is a group within the Republican Party that represents LGBT conservatives and allies and advocates for LGBT rights and equality.

Voting rights 

Virtually all restrictions on voting have in recent years been implemented by Republicans. Republicans, mainly at the state level, argue that the restrictions (such as the purging of voter rolls, limiting voting locations, and limiting early and mail-in voting) are vital to prevent voter fraud, saying that voter fraud is an underestimated issue in elections. Polling has found majority support for early voting, automatic voter registration and voter ID laws among the general population.

In defending their restrictions to voting rights, Republicans have made false and exaggerated claims about the extent of voter fraud in the United States; all existing research indicates that it is extremely rare, and civil and voting rights organizations often accuse Republicans of enacting restrictions to influence elections in the party's favor. Many laws or regulations restricting voting enacted by Republicans have been successfully challenged in court, with court rulings striking down such regulations and accusing Republicans of establishing them with partisan purpose.

After the Supreme Court decision in Shelby County v. Holder rolled back aspects of the Voting Rights Act of 1965, Republicans introduced cuts to early voting, purges of voter rolls and imposition of strict voter ID laws. The 2016 Republican platform advocated proof of citizenship as a prerequisite for registering to vote and photo ID as a prerequisite when voting.

After Donald Trump and his Republican allies made false claims of fraud during the 2020 presidential election, Republicans launched a nationwide effort to impose tighter election laws at the state level. Such bills are centered around limiting mail-in voting, strengthening voter ID laws, shortening early voting, eliminating automatic and same-day voter registration, curbing the use of ballot drop boxes, and allowing for increased purging of voter rolls. Republicans in at least eight states have also introduced bills that would give lawmakers greater power over election administration, after they were unsuccessful in their attempts to overturn election results in swing states won by Biden.

Supporters of the bills argue they would improve election security and reverse temporary changes enacted during the COVID-19 pandemic; they point to false claims of significant election fraud, as well as the substantial public distrust of the integrity of the 2020 election those claims have fostered, as justification. Political analysts say that the efforts amount to voter suppression, are intended to advantage Republicans by reducing the number of people who vote, and would disproportionately affect minority voters.

Composition 

In the Party's early decades, its base consisted of northern white Protestants and African Americans nationwide. Its first presidential candidate, John C. Frémont, received almost no votes in the South. This trend continued into the 20th century. Following the passage of the Civil Rights Act of 1964 and Voting Rights Act of 1965, the southern states became more reliably Republican in presidential politics, while northeastern states became more reliably Democratic. Studies show that southern whites shifted to the Republican Party due to racial conservatism.

While scholars agree that a racial backlash played a central role in the racial realignment of the two parties, certain experts dispute the extent in which the racial realignment was a top-driven elite process or a bottom-up process. The "Southern Strategy" refers primarily to "top-down" narratives of the political realignment of the South which suggest that Republican leaders consciously appealed to many white southerners' racial grievances in order to gain their support. This top-down narrative of the Southern Strategy is generally believed to be the primary force that transformed Southern politics following the civil rights era. Scholar Matthew Lassiter argues that "demographic change played a more important role than racial demagoguery in the emergence of a two-party system in the American South". Historians such as Matthew Lassiter, Kevin M. Kruse and Joseph Crespino, have presented an alternative, "bottom-up" narrative, which Lassiter has called the "suburban strategy." This narrative recognizes the centrality of racial backlash to the political realignment of the South, but suggests that this backlash took the form of a defense of de facto segregation in the suburbs rather than overt resistance to racial integration and that the story of this backlash is a national rather than a strictly southern one.

The Party's 21st-century base consists of groups such as white voters, particularly male, but a majority of white women as well; heterosexual married couples; rural residents; and non-union workers without college degrees. Meanwhile, urban residents, union workers, most ethnic minorities, the unmarried, and sexual minorities tend to vote for the Democratic Party. The suburbs have become a major battleground. Since the 2010s, the party is strongest in the South, most of the Midwestern and Mountain States, and Alaska. According to a 2015 Gallup poll, 25% of Americans identify as Republican and 16% identify as leaning Republican. In comparison, 30% identify as Democratic and 16% identify as leaning Democratic. The Democratic Party has typically held an overall edge in party identification since Gallup began polling on the issue in 1991. In 2016, The New York Times noted that the Republican Party was strong in the South, the Great Plains, and the Mountain States. The 21st century Republican Party also draws strength from rural areas of the United States. In recent years, the party has made significant gains among the white working class, Hispanics, and Orthodox Jews while losing support among most upper-class and college-educated whites.

Rise of Political Polarization

Towards the end of the 1990s and in the early 21st century, the Republican Party increasingly resorted to "constitutional hardball" practices.

A number of scholars have asserted that the House speakership of Republican Newt Gingrich played a key role in undermining democratic norms in the United States, hastening political polarization, and increasing partisan prejudice. According to Harvard University political scientists Daniel Ziblatt and Steven Levitsky, Gingrich's speakership had a profound and lasting impact on American politics and the health of American democracy. They argue that Gingrich instilled a "combative" approach in the Republican Party, where hateful language and hyper-partisanship became commonplace, and where democratic norms were abandoned. Gingrich frequently questioned the patriotism of Democrats, called them corrupt, compared them to fascists, and accused them of wanting to destroy the United States. Gingrich was also involved in several major government shutdowns.

Scholars have also characterized Mitch McConnell's tenure as Senate Minority Leader and Senate Majority Leader during the Obama presidency as one where obstructionism reached all-time highs. Political scientists have referred to McConnell's use of the filibuster as "constitutional hardball", referring to the misuse of procedural tools in a way that undermines democracy. McConnell delayed and obstructed health care reform and banking reform, which were two landmark pieces of legislation that Democrats sought to pass (and in fact did pass) early in Obama's tenure. By delaying Democratic priority legislation, McConnell stymied the output of Congress. Political scientists Eric Schickler and Gregory J. Wawro write, "by slowing action even on measures supported by many Republicans, McConnell capitalized on the scarcity of floor time, forcing Democratic leaders into difficult trade-offs concerning which measures were worth pursuing. That is, given that Democrats had just two years with sizeable majorities to enact as much of their agenda as possible, slowing the Senate's ability to process even routine measures limited the sheer volume of liberal bills that could be adopted."

McConnell's refusal to hold hearings on Supreme Court nominee Merrick Garland during the final year of Obama's presidency was described by political scientists and legal scholars as "unprecedented", a "culmination of this confrontational style", a "blatant abuse of constitutional norms", and a "classic example of constitutional hardball."

After the 2020 United States presidential election was declared for Biden, President Donald Trump's refusal to concede and demands of Republican state legislatures and officials to ignore the popular vote of the states was described as "unparalleled" in American history and "profoundly antidemocratic". Some journalists and foreign officials have also referred to Trump as a fascist in the aftermath of the January 6 United States Capitol attack. Following the attack, a survey conducted by the American Enterprise Institute found that 56% of Republicans agreed with the statement, "The traditional American way of life is disappearing so fast that we may have to use force to save it," compared to 36% of respondents overall. Sixty percent of white evangelical Republicans agreed with the statement.

Ideology and factions 

Political scientists characterize the Republican Party as more ideologically cohesive than the Democratic Party, which is composed of a broader diversity of coalitions.

In 2018, Gallup polling found that 69% of Republicans described themselves as "conservative", while 25% opted for the term "moderate", and another 5% self-identified as "liberal". When ideology is separated into social and economic issues, a 2020 Gallup poll found that 61% of Republicans and Republican-leaning independents called themselves "socially conservative", 28% chose the label "socially moderate", and 10% called themselves "socially liberal". On economic issues, the same 2020 poll revealed that 65% of Republicans (and Republican leaners) chose the label "economic conservative" to describe their views on fiscal policy, while 26% selected the label "economic moderate", and 7% opted for the "economic liberal" label.

The modern Republican Party includes conservatives, centrists, fiscal conservatives, libertarians, neoconservatives, paleoconservatives, right-wing populists, and social conservatives.

In addition to splits over ideology, the 21st-century Republican Party can be broadly divided into establishment and anti-establishment wings. Nationwide polls of Republican voters in 2014 by the Pew Center identified a growing split in the Republican coalition, between "business conservatives" or "establishment conservatives" on one side and "steadfast conservatives" or "populist conservatives" on the other.

Talk Radio and Right-Wing Media 

Starting in the late 20th century, conservatives on talk radio and Fox News, as well as online media outlets such as the Daily Caller and Breitbart News, became a powerful influence on shaping the information received and judgments made by rank-and-file Republicans. They include Rush Limbaugh, Sean Hannity, Larry Elder, Glenn Beck, Mark Levin, Dana Loesch, Hugh Hewitt, Mike Gallagher, Neal Boortz, Laura Ingraham, Dennis Prager, Michael Reagan, Howie Carr and Michael Savage, as well as many local commentators who support Republican causes while vocally opposing the left. Vice President Mike Pence also had an early career in conservative talk radio, hosting The Mike Pence Show in the late 1990s before successfully running for Congress in 2000.

In recent years, pundits through podcasting and YouTube like Ben Shapiro and Steven Crowder have also gained fame with a consistently younger audience through outlets such as The Daily Wire and Blaze Media.

Business community 
The Republican Party has traditionally been a pro-business party. It garners major support from a wide variety of industries from the financial sector to small businesses. Republicans are 24 percent more likely to be business owners than Democrats. Prominent business lobbying groups such as the U.S. Chamber of Commerce and National Association of Manufacturers have traditionally supported Republican candidates and economic policies. Although both major parties support capitalism, the Republican Party is more likely to favor private property rights (including intellectual property rights) than the Democratic Party over competing interests such as protecting the environment or lowering medication costs.

A survey cited by The Washington Post in 2012 stated that 61 percent of small business owners planned to vote for Republican presidential candidate Mitt Romney. Small business became a major theme of the 2012 Republican National Convention.

Demographics 
Percent of party identification in the United States in 2022, by generation

data from Statista

In 2006, Republicans won 38% of the voters aged 18–29. In a 2018 study, members of the Silent and Baby Boomer generations were more likely to express approval of Trump's presidency than those of Generation X and Millennials.

Low-income voters are more likely to identify as Democrats while high-income voters are more likely to identify as Republicans. In 2012, Obama won 60% of voters with income under $50,000 and 45% of those with incomes higher than that. Bush won 41% of the poorest 20% of voters in 2004, 55% of the richest twenty percent and 53% of those in between. In the 2006 House races, the voters with incomes over $50,000 were 49% Republican while those with incomes under that amount were 38% Republican.

Gender 

Since 1980, a "gender gap" has seen stronger support for the Republican Party among men than among women. Unmarried and divorced women were far more likely to vote for Democrat John Kerry than for Republican George W. Bush in the 2004 presidential election. In 2006 House races, 43% of women voted Republican while 47% of men did so. In the 2010 midterms, the "gender gap" was reduced, with women supporting Republican and Democratic candidates equally (49%–49%). Exit polls from the 2012 elections revealed a continued weakness among unmarried women for the GOP, a large and growing portion of the electorate. Although women supported Obama over Mitt Romney by a margin of 55–44% in 2012, Romney prevailed amongst married women, 53–46%. Obama won unmarried women 67–31%.

However, according to a December 2019 study, "White women are the only group of female voters who support Republican Party candidates for president. They have done so by a majority in all but 2 of the last 18 elections".

Education 
Until 2016, affluent voters and usually more-educated voters leaned more towards Republicans in presidential elections, but after 2016 the norm reversed. Those without college educations tend to be more socially conservative on a wide array of issues. 

In 2012, the Pew Research Center conducted a study of registered voters with a 35–28 Democrat-to-Republican gap. They found that self-described Democrats had an eight-point advantage over Republicans among college graduates and a fourteen-point advantage among all post-graduates polled. Republicans had an eleven-point advantage among white men with college degrees; Democrats had a ten-point advantage among women with degrees. Democrats accounted for 36% of all respondents with an education of high school or less; Republicans accounted for 28%. When isolating just white registered voters polled, Republicans had a six-point advantage overall and a nine-point advantage among those with a high school education or less. Following the 2016 presidential election, exit polls indicated that "Donald Trump attracted a large share of the vote from whites without a college degree, receiving 72 percent of the white non-college male vote and 62 percent of the white non-college female vote." Overall, 52% of voters with college degrees voted for Hillary Clinton in 2016, while 52% of voters without college degrees voted for Trump.

Ethnicity 

Republicans have been winning under 15% of the African American vote in national elections since 1980. The party abolished chattel slavery under Abraham Lincoln, defeated the Slave Power, and gave black people the legal right to vote during Reconstruction in the late 1860s. Until the New Deal of the 1930s, black people supported the Republican Party by large margins. Black delegates were a sizable share of southern delegates to the national Republican convention from Reconstruction until the start of the 20th century when their share began to decline. Black voters began shifting away from the Republican Party after the close of Reconstruction through the early 20th century, with the rise of the southern-Republican lily-white movement. Black people shifted in large margins to the Democratic Party in the 1930s, when major Democratic figures such as Eleanor Roosevelt began to support civil rights and the New Deal offered them employment opportunities. They became one of the core components of the New Deal coalition. In the South, after the Voting Rights Act to prohibit racial discrimination in elections was passed by a bipartisan coalition in 1965, black people were able to vote again and ever since have formed a significant portion (20–50%) of the Democratic vote in that region.

In the 2010 elections, two African American Republicans—Tim Scott and Allen West—were elected to the House of Representatives. As of January 2023, there are four African-American Republicans in the House of Representatives and one African American Republican in the United States Senate. In recent decades, Republicans have been moderately successful in gaining support from Hispanic and Asian American voters. George W. Bush, who campaigned energetically for Hispanic votes, received 35% of their vote in 2000 and 44% in 2004. The party's strong anti-communist stance has made it popular among some minority groups from current and former Communist states, in particular Cuban Americans, Korean Americans, Chinese Americans and Vietnamese Americans. The 2007 election of Bobby Jindal as Governor of Louisiana was hailed as pathbreaking. Jindal became the first elected minority governor in Louisiana and the first state governor of Indian descent.

Republicans have gained support among racial and ethnic minorities, particularly among those who are working class, Hispanic or Latino (including Cuban Americans), or Asian American since the 2010s. According to John Avlon, in 2013, the Republican party was more ethnically diverse at the statewide elected official level than the Democratic Party was; GOP statewide elected officials included Latino Nevada Governor Brian Sandoval and African-American U.S. senator Tim Scott of South Carolina.

In 2012, 88% of Romney voters were white while 56% of Obama voters were white. In the 2008 presidential election, John McCain won 55% of white votes, 35% of Asian votes, 31% of Hispanic votes and 4% of African American votes. In the 2010 House election, Republicans won 60% of the white votes, 38% of Hispanic votes and 9% of the African American vote.

As of 2020, Republican candidates had lost the popular vote in seven out of the last eight presidential elections. Since 1992, the only time they won the popular vote in a presidential election is the 2004 United States presidential election. Demographers have pointed to the steady decline (as a percentage of the eligible voters) of its core base of older, rural white men. However, Donald Trump managed to increase nonwhite support to 26% of his total votes in the 2020 election — the highest percentage for a GOP presidential candidate since 1960.

Religious beliefs 

Religion has always played a major role for both parties, but in the course of a century, the parties' religious compositions have changed. Religion was a major dividing line between the parties before 1960, with Catholics, Jews, and southern Protestants heavily Democratic and northeastern Protestants heavily Republican. Most of the old differences faded away after the realignment of the 1970s and 1980s that undercut the New Deal coalition. Voters who attended church weekly gave 61% of their votes to Bush in 2004; those who attended occasionally gave him only 47%; and those who never attended gave him 36%. Fifty-nine percent of Protestants voted for Bush, along with 52% of Catholics (even though John Kerry was Catholic). Since 1980, a large majority of evangelicals has voted Republican; 70–80% voted for Bush in 2000 and 2004 and 70% for Republican House candidates in 2006. 

Members of the Church of Jesus Christ of Latter-day Saints, who mainly live in Utah and some neighboring states, voted 75% or more for George W. Bush in 2000. Members of the Mormon faith had a mixed relationship with Donald Trump during his tenure, despite 67% of them voting for him in 2016 and 56% of them supporting his presidency in 2018, disapproving of his personal behavior such as that shown during the Access Hollywood controversy. Their opinion on Trump hadn't affected their party affiliation, however, as 76% of Mormons in 2018 expressed preference for generic Republican congressional candidates.

Jews continue to vote 70–80% Democratic; however, a slim majority of Orthodox Jews voted for the Republican Party in 2016, following years of growing Orthodox Jewish support for the party due to its social conservatism and increasingly pro-Israel foreign policy stance. Over 70% of Orthodox Jews identify as Republican or Republican leaning as of 2021. An exit poll conducted by the Associated Press for 2020 found 35% of Muslims voted for Donald Trump. The mainline traditional Protestants (Methodists, Lutherans, Presbyterians, Episcopalians and Disciples) have dropped to about 55% Republican (in contrast to 75% before 1968). Democrats have close links with the African American churches, especially the National Baptists, while their historic dominance among Catholic voters has eroded to 54–46 in the 2010 midterms.

Although once strongly Democratic, Roman Catholic voters have recently been politically divided, with both 52% of such voters voting for Trump in 2016 and Biden in 2020. While Catholic Republican leaders try to stay in line with the teachings of the Catholic Church on subjects such as abortion, contraception, euthanasia, and embryonic stem cell research, they tend to differ on the death penalty and same-sex marriage. Pope Francis' 2015 encyclical Laudato si' sparked a discussion on the positions of Catholic Republicans in relation to the positions of the Church. 
The Pope's encyclical on behalf of the Catholic Church officially acknowledges a man-made climate change caused by burning fossil fuels. The Pope says the warming of the planet is rooted in a throwaway culture and the developed world's indifference to the destruction of the planet in pursuit of short-term economic gains. According to The New York Times, Laudato si''' put pressure on the Catholic candidates in the 2016 election: Jeb Bush, Bobby Jindal, Marco Rubio and Rick Santorum. 

With leading Democrats praising the encyclical, James Bretzke, a professor of moral theology at Boston College, has said that both sides were being disingenuous: "I think it shows that both the Republicans and the Democrats ... like to use religious authority and, in this case, the Pope to support positions they have arrived at independently ... There is a certain insincerity, hypocrisy I think, on both sides". While a Pew Research poll indicates Catholics are more likely to believe the Earth is warming than non-Catholics, 51% of Catholic Republicans believe in global warming (less than the general population) and only 24% of Catholic Republicans believe global warming is caused by human activity.

 Republican presidents 

As of 2021, there have been a total of 19 Republican presidents.

Current Supreme Court Justices appointed by Republican presidents since 1991
, six of the nine seats are filled by Justices appointed by Republican Presidents George H. W. Bush, George W. Bush, and Donald Trump.

 Recent electoral history 
 In congressional elections: 1950–present 

 In presidential elections: 1856–present 

 See also 

 Factions in the Republican Party (United States)
 List of African-American Republicans
 List of Hispanic and Latino Republicans
 List of state parties of the Republican Party (United States)
 List of United States Republican Party presidential tickets
 Political party strength in U.S. states

 Notes 

 References 

 Further reading 

 The Almanac of American Politics 2022 (2022) details on members of Congress, and the governors: their records and election results; also state and district politics; revised every two years since 1975. details; see The Almanac of American Politics
 American National Biography (20 volumes, 1999) covers all politicians no longer alive; online at many academic libraries and at Wikipedia Library.
 Aberbach, Joel D., ed. and Peele, Gillian, ed. Crisis of Conservatism?: The Republican Party, the Conservative Movement, and American Politics after Bush (Oxford UP, 2011). 403pp
 Aistrup, Joseph A. The Southern Strategy Revisited: Republican Top-Down Advancement in the South (1996).
 Black, Earl and Merle Black. The Rise of Southern Republicans (2002).
 Bowen, Michael, The Roots of Modern Conservatism: Dewey, Taft, and the Battle for the Soul of the Republican Party. (U of North Carolina Press, 2011). xii, 254pp.
 Brennan, Mary C. Turning Right in the Sixties: The Conservative Capture of the GOP (1995).
 Conger, Kimberly H. The Christian Right in Republican State Politics (2010) 202 pages; focuses on Arizona, Indiana, and Missouri.
 Crane, Michael. The Political Junkie Handbook: The Definitive Reference Books on Politics (2004) covers all the major issues explaining the parties' positions.
 Critchlow, Donald T. The Conservative Ascendancy: How the Republican Right Rose to Power in Modern America (2nd ed. 2011).
 Ehrman, John, The Eighties: America in the Age of Reagan (2005).
 Fauntroy, Michael K. Republicans and the Black vote (2007).
 
 Frank, Thomas. What's the Matter with Kansas? How Conservatives Won the Heart of America (2005).
 Frum, David. What's Right: The New Conservative Majority and the Remaking of America (1996).
 
 Hemmer, Nicole. Partisans: The Conservative Revolutionaries Who Remade American Politics in the 1990s (2022)
 
 Judis, John B. and Ruy Teixeira. The Emerging Democratic Majority (2004), two Democrats project social trends.
 Kabaservice, Geoffrey. Rule and Ruin: The Downfall of Moderation and the Destruction of the Republican Party, From Eisenhower to the Tea Party (2012) scholarly history .
 Kleppner, Paul, et al. The Evolution of American Electoral Systems (1983), applies party systems model.
 Kurian, George Thomas ed. The Encyclopedia of the Republican Party (4 vol., 2002).
 Lamis, Alexander P. ed. Southern Politics in the 1990s (1999).
 Levendusky, Matthew. The Partisan Sort: How Liberals Became Democrats and Conservatives Became Republicans (2009). Chicago Studies in American Politics.
 Mason, Robert. The Republican Party and American Politics from Hoover to Reagan (2011).
 Mason, Robert and Morgan, Iwan (eds.) Seeking a New Majority: The Republican Party and American Politics, 1960–1980. (2013) Nashville, TN. Vanderbilt University Press. 2013.
 Mayer, George H. The Republican Party, 1854–1966. 2d ed. (1967).
 
 Oakes, James. The Crooked Path to Abolition: Abraham Lincoln and the Antislavery Constitution (W.W. Norton, 2021).
 Oakes, James. Freedom National: The Destruction of Slavery in the United States, 1861–1865 (W. W. Norton, 2012)
 Perlstein, Rick. Before the Storm: Barry Goldwater and the Unmaking of the American Consensus (2002), broad account of 1964.
 Perlstein, Rick. Nixonland: The Rise of a President and the Fracturing of America (2009).
 Reinhard, David W. The Republican Right since 1945 (1983).
 Rutland, Robert Allen. The Republicans: From Lincoln to Bush (1996).
 Sabato, Larry J. Divided States of America: The Slash and Burn Politics of the 2004 Presidential Election (2005).
 Sabato, Larry J. and Bruce Larson. The Party's Just Begun: Shaping Political Parties for America's Future (2001), textbook.
 Schlesinger, Arthur Meier Jr. ed. History of American Presidential Elections, 1789–2000 (various multivolume editions, latest is 2001). Essays on the most important election are reprinted in Schlesinger, The Coming to Power: Critical presidential elections in American history (1972).
 Shafer, Byron E. and Anthony J. Badger, eds. Contesting Democracy: Substance and Structure in American Political History, 1775–2000 (2001), long essays by specialists on each time period:
 includes: "To One or Another of These Parties Every Man Belongs": 1820–1865 by Joel H. Silbey; "Change and Continuity in the Party Period: 1835–1885" by Michael F. Holt; "The Transformation of American Politics: 1865–1910" by Peter H. Argersinger; "Democracy, Republicanism, and Efficiency: 1885–1930" by Richard Jensen; "The Limits of Federal Power and Social Policy: 1910–1955" by Anthony J. Badger; "The Rise of Rights and Rights Consciousness: 1930–1980" by James T. Patterson; and "Economic Growth, Issue Evolution, and Divided Government: 1955–2000" by Byron E. Shafer.
 Shafer, Byron and Richard Johnston. The End of Southern Exceptionalism (2006), uses statistical election data and polls to argue GOP growth was primarily a response to economic change.
 Steely, Mel. The Gentleman from Georgia: The Biography of Newt Gingrich Mercer University Press, 2000. .
 Sundquist, James L. Dynamics of the Party System: Alignment and Realignment of Political Parties in the United States (1983).
 Wooldridge, Adrian and John Micklethwait. The Right Nation: Conservative Power in America'' (2004).

External links 

 
 .

 
1854 establishments in Wisconsin
Political parties established in 1854
Conservative parties in the United States
International Democrat Union member parties
Political parties in the United States
Social conservative parties
Republicanism in the United States
Reconstruction Era
American Civil War political groups
Politics of the American Civil War
American abolitionist organizations
Anti-abortion organizations in the United States